Double Trouble is a 1915 American silent romantic comedy film  written and directed by Christy Cabanne, produced by D.W. Griffith, and starring Douglas Fairbanks in one of his earliest motion pictures. The film is based on the novel of the same name by Herbert Quick. The plot, a variant on the theme of Jekyll and Hyde, revolves around a very shy, "effeminate" banker who acquires a second, rakish and flirtatious personality after receiving a blow on the head.  The film was a popular and critical success.

A print of the film is held by the Cohen Media Group.

Plot summary

Cast
 Douglas Fairbanks - Florian Amidon/Eugene Brassfield
 Margery Wilson - Elizabeth Waldron
 Richard Cummings - Judge Blodgett
 Olga Grey - Madame Leclaire
 Gladys Brockwell - Daisy "Strawberry" Scarlett
 Monroe Salisbury - Hotel Clerk
 William Lowery - Brassfield's Political Opponent
 Tom Kennedy - Brassfield's Heavy
 Kate Toncray - Wife of Brassfield's Political Opponent 
 Lillian Langdon - Mrs. Waldron

References

External links
 
 
 
 
  still photograph, imagery from the film(archived)

1915 films
1910s romantic comedy films
American romantic comedy films
American silent feature films
American black-and-white films
Films about amnesia
Films based on American novels
Films directed by Christy Cabanne
Films shot in California
Triangle Film Corporation films
1915 comedy films
1910s American films
Silent romantic comedy films
Silent American comedy films